Abd Al Raouf Sinu (Arabic:عبد الرؤوف سنو; born 1948) is a Lebanese author who was born in Beirut. He was a member of the international delegation for Election Observation in Germany, 2009. Sinu received his PhD in philosophy of history from (The Free University of Berlin) in 1982. He served as Dean of the Faculty of Education in (The Lebanese University) from 2001 to 2004. He became a member of (The advisory board of the Orient-Institut Beirut) in Germany from 2008 till date. Also, he is a member of plenty of international and local boards, most notably are: 'The International Delegation of Germany's Election Observation', and 'The Board of Trustees of the Development, Studies, and Pedagogic Clinic Foundation in Beirut'.

Sinu won the Sheikh Zayed Book Award for his book which is titled as 'Lebanon War 1975–1990, Disintegration of the State and Fracture of Society'.

Works 
He has published several literary works, including:

 "The Clergy – Property and Power – Research in the Social History of Lebanon".
 "German Interests in Syria and Palestine 1841–1901", Arab Development Institute 1987.
 "Germany and Islam in the Nineteenth and Twentieth Centuries", Beirut: Al-Furat, 2007.
 "Lebanon War 1975–1990, Disintegration of the State and Fracture of Society", Beirut: Arab Scientific Publishers, 2008.
 "Islamic Internal Conflicts in the Ottoman Empire 1877–1881, the Levant, Hijaz, Kurdistan, Albany", Bissan Publishers and Distributers, 1998.
 "Saudi Arabia During the Reign of King Abdullah bin Abdulaziz", 2017.
 "Saudi Arabia and Lebanon: Politics and Economy, 1943–2011 – Volume II", Al-Furat For Publishing & Distributing, Beirut, 2016.
 "Polar Cities in Lebanon: Beirut-Tripoli-Zahlé-Sidon", 2018.
 "Lebanon -The Country of Communities- Post The Taif Agreement: Problems of Coexistence, Supremacy, and External Roles", 2015.
 "The Great Lebanon, Or is Lebanon a Historical Mistake? Disputes over Entity Genesis and Identity", written by Dr. Louis Slyba, presented by Dr. Abdel-Raouf Sinno, Dar Byblion, 2015.

Awards 

 Sheikh Zayed Book Award (Contribution to the Development of Nations) for his book: Lebanon War 1975–1990 Disintegration of the State and Fracture of Society.

References 

Lebanese writers
1948 births
Living people